Ichneutica is a genus of cutworm or dart moths in the family Noctuidae. The genus is found in New Zealand and surrounding islands. There are more than 80 described species in Ichneutica, the largest known genus of Lepidoptera in New Zealand. In 2019 this genus was revised and greatly expanded with the genera Graphania Hampson, 1905, Tmetolophota Hampson, 1905 and Dipaustica Meyrick, 1912 all subsumed within it.

Species
These species belong to the genus Ichneutica:

 Ichneutica acontistis (Meyrick, 1887)
 Ichneutica agorastis (Meyrick, 1887)
 Ichneutica alopa (Meyrick, 1887)
 Ichneutica arotis (Meyrick, 1887)
 Ichneutica atristriga (Walker, 1865)
 Ichneutica averilla (Hudson, 1921)
 Ichneutica barbara  Hoare, 2019
 Ichneutica blenheimensis (Fereday, 1883)
 Ichneutica bromias (Meyrick, 1902)
 Ichneutica brunneosa (Fox, 1970)
 Ichneutica cana Howes, 1914
 Ichneutica ceraunias Meyrick, 1887
 Ichneutica chlorodonta (Hampson, 1911)
 Ichneutica chryserythra (Hampson, 1905)
 Ichneutica cornuta  Hoare, 2019
 Ichneutica cuneata (Philpott, 1916)
 Ichneutica dione Hudson, 1898
 Ichneutica disjungens (Walker, 1858)
 Ichneutica dundastica  Hoare, 2019
 Ichneutica emmersonorum  Hoare, 2019
 Ichneutica epiastra (Meyrick, 1911)
 Ichneutica erebia (Hudson, 1909)
 Ichneutica eris  Hoare, 2019
 Ichneutica falsidica (Meyrick, 1911)
 Ichneutica fenwicki (Philpott, 1921)
 Ichneutica fibriata (Meyrick, 1913)
 Ichneutica haedifrontella  Hoare, 2019
 Ichneutica hartii (Howes, 1914)
 Ichneutica infensa (Walker, 1857)
 Ichneutica inscripta  Hoare, 2019
 Ichneutica insignis (Walker, 1865)
 Ichneutica lignana (Walker, 1857)
 Ichneutica lindsayorum (Dugdale, 1988)
 Ichneutica lissoxyla (Meyrick, 1911)
 Ichneutica lithias (Meyrick, 1887)
 Ichneutica lyfordi  Hoare, 2019
 Ichneutica marmorata (Hudson, 1924)
 Ichneutica maya (Hudson, 1898)
 Ichneutica micrastra (Meyrick, 1897)
 Ichneutica moderata (Walker, 1865)
 Ichneutica mollis (Howes, 1908)
 Ichneutica morosa (Butler, 1880)
 Ichneutica mustulenta  Hoare, 2019
 Ichneutica mutans (Walker, 1857)
 Ichneutica naufraga  Hoare, 2019
 Ichneutica nobilia (Howes, 1946)
 Ichneutica notata Salmon, 1946
 Ichneutica nullifera (Walker, 1857)
 Ichneutica olivea (Watt, 1916)
 Ichneutica oliveri (Hampson, 1911)
 Ichneutica omicron (Hudson, 1898)
 Ichneutica omoplaca (Meyrick, 1887)
 Ichneutica pagaia (Hudson, 1909)
 Ichneutica panda (Philpott, 1920)
 Ichneutica paracausta (Meyrick, 1887)
 Ichneutica paraxysta (Meyrick, 1929)
 Ichneutica pelanodes (Meyrick, 1931)
 Ichneutica peridotea  Hoare, 2019
 Ichneutica petrograpta (Meyrick, 1929)
 Ichneutica phaula (Meyrick, 1887)
 Ichneutica plena (Walker, 1865)
 Ichneutica prismatica  Hoare, 2019
 Ichneutica propria (Walker, 1856)
 Ichneutica purdii (Fereday, 1883)
 Ichneutica rubescens (Butler, 1879)
 Ichneutica rufistriga  Hoare, 2019
 Ichneutica sapiens (Meyrick, 1929)
 Ichneutica schistella  Hoare, 2019
 Ichneutica scutata (Meyrick, 1929)
 Ichneutica seducta  Hoare, 2019
 Ichneutica semivittata (Walker, 1865)
 Ichneutica sericata (Howes, 1945)
 Ichneutica similis (Philpott, 1924)
 Ichneutica sistens (Guenée, 1868)
 Ichneutica skelloni (Butler, 1880)
 Ichneutica sollennis (Meyrick, 1914)
 Ichneutica steropastis (Meyrick, 1887)
 Ichneutica stulta (Philpott, 1905)
 Ichneutica subcyprea  Hoare, 2019
 Ichneutica sulcana (Fereday, 1880)
 Ichneutica supersulcana  Hoare, 2019
 Ichneutica thalassarche  Hoare, 2019
 Ichneutica theobroma  Hoare, 2019
 Ichneutica toroneura (Meyrick, 1901)
 Ichneutica unica (Walker, 1856)
 Ichneutica ustistriga (Walker, 1857)
 Ichneutica virescens (Butler, 1879)

References

Noctuinae
Noctuoidea genera